HMS St. James was a  of the Royal Navy. She was named in honour of the Battle of St. James Day which took place in 1666.

St. James was built by Fairfields at Govan. She was launched on 7 June 1945 and commissioned on 12 July 1946.

Operational service
In 1946, St. James joined the 5th Destroyer Flotilla, part of the Home Fleet. On 25 August 1946, while undergoing calibration trials off the Isle of Portland, she accidentally hit and sank the tug Buccaneer with a 4.5-inch shell, while aiming at the target Buccaneer was towing. St. Jamess captain, Commander J. Lee Barber, went alongside and took off Buccaneers crew without loss, but St. James suffered a damaged propeller when the tug capsized. An inquiry was held aboard the cruiser  on 28 August, at which it was decided that no further action would be taken.

In 1950, St. James deployed on a Home Fleet Spring Cruise, which saw her, as well as many other vessels, including the aircraft carrier  and two other carriers, as well as the battleship , visit the Mediterranean, which included stops in Italy. The group performed the usual naval exercises in the region, as well as undertaking 'fly-the-flag' visits to a number of ports.

In 1953, St. James was placed in reserve along with a number of her sister ships. However she did take part in the Fleet Review to celebrate the Coronation of Queen Elizabeth II.

In 1957, St. James finally began a refit to modernise the destroyer, but just the following year, her refit was cancelled, and she was subsequently placed on the disposal list. In 1961, at Newport, St. James was broken up.

References

Publications
 
 
 

 

Battle-class destroyers of the Royal Navy
Ships built in Govan
1945 ships
Cold War destroyers of the United Kingdom